The Chachro Raid was a long-range raid conducted between 5 December 1971 and 10 December 1971 by the Indian Army's 10 Para battalion on the town of Chachro and other nearby towns of Sindh. The raid resulted in the Indian Army capturing large territory of 13,000 sq.km in the Sindh region of Pakistan. The Indian soldiers penetrated into Pakistani territory up to 80 km, captured a number of posts and returned without suffering a single casualty. They were accompanied by Khoja Rajputs who were familiar with the region.

Background
The 10 Para battalion was raised in 1967, specialised for desert operations. From five months prior to the 1971 war, two teams (Alpha and Charlie) of 10 Para were trained intensively to carry out long range raids, inspired by British SAS raids of German airfields in North Africa during the Second World War.

The raid
The teams of 10 Para were given the objective of striking Pakistani positions 80 km inside, hitting supply lines and creating confusion.
The raid began on the night of 5 December, with Alpha team advancing quietly through the night towards Chachro. However they were spotted by a Pakistani outpost in the morning, and came under attack and were forced to take cover. To break the impasse, Naik Nihal Singh took a jeep and charged at high speed at the Pakistani post, firing the mounted light machine gun. This allowed the rest of the team to also attack, with 18 machine guns firing in unison, causing the Pakistani defenders to flee.

Next, on the night of 7 December, the raiders moved to capture the wing headquarters of the Pakistan Rangers in Chachro. Alpha team took covering positions, while Charlie team moved in for the offensive. By first light, Chachro was captured. In the raid, 17 Rangers  were killed, and 12 captured alive. The post and the prisoners were handed over to the 20 Rajput battalion which had linked up.

After that, the team crept towards Virawah, reaching it close to midnight. They attacked the Ranger camp there, resulting in the rangers at Virawah also abandoning the post and fleeing. The unit then proceeded towards the tehsil headquarters of Nagarparkar and captured it as well before the daybreak of 8 December. After the arrival of the regular infantry, the prisoners were handed over. Thereafter, the unit was tasked with destroying an ammunition dump at Islamkot. However, on arrival, it found the place to be empty. While heading back towards India, it spotted a Pakistani convoy at Lumio and ambushed it, killing 20 Pakistani soldiers and taking others prisoners.

Result
By the end of the war, India captured an area of about 13,000 sq km of Sindh up to Umerkot. India continued to hold the captured territory until 22 December 1972 and handed it over to Pakistan after the Shimla Pact of 1972. During this time, an Indian sub-post office was opened at Chachro and allotted a Postal Index Number.

10 Para was conferred the Battle Honour 'Chachro 1971', and received 10 gallantry awards including a Mahavir Chakra awarded to its commanding officer Lt Col Bhawani Singh.

The Chachro Raid was the first long-distance raid across desert terrain undertaken by the Indian Army, and became a benchmark for future operations of a similar nature.

References

Indo-Pakistani War of 1971